The Bank of Spain Building (Spanish: edificio del Banco de España) is the main headquarters of the Bank of Spain. Located in Madrid, it lies at the crossing of the Calle de Alcalá and the Paseo del Prado.

History 

Finished by 1891, the building was inaugurated on 3 March 1891.

The building endured a first enlargement process between 1932 and 1936. Further renovations were finished in 1969 and 2006.

In December 1999, the building was declared Property of Cultural Interest, under the Monument descriptor.

References 
Citations

Bibliography
 
 

Economy of Madrid
Buildings and structures in Cortes neighborhood, Madrid
Bien de Interés Cultural landmarks in Madrid
Calle de Alcalá
Bank of Spain